Georgij Albertovich Krasinsky (Георгий Альбертович Красинский, February 19, 1939; Leningrad, USSR – March 17, 2011, Saint Petersburg) was a Russian astronomer active at the Institute of Applied Astronomy,  Russian Academy of Science, St Petersburg. He was notable for research on planetary motions and ephemerides.

Krasinsky graduated in 1961 from the Faculty of Mathematics and Mechanics  of Leningrad State University.  He then became a graduate student and, subsequently, an employee of the Институт теоретической астрономии АН СССР (Institute of Theoretical Astronomy, Academy of Sciences of the USSR). In 1965 he successfully defended his thesis for the Russian Candidate of Science degree (Ph.D.) in physical and mathematical sciences. In 1988 he was transferred to the Institute of Applied Astronomy of the Academy of Sciences of the USSR. There in 1989 he completed his dissertation for the Russian Doctor of Sciences degree (similar to habilitation). Krasinsky and colleagues developed and implemented a problem-oriented language SLON and a software system (called the ERA system) for solving problems in dynamic and ephemeris astronomy. (ERA is the acronym for "Ephemerides for Research in Astronomy".) Krasinsky and colleagues applied the ERA software system to develop a high-precision, long-term numerical theory of the motions of our solar system's planets and Earth's moon.

Krasinsky was the president of IAU commission 4-DI on ephemerides during 2003-2006.

The asteroid 5714 Krasinsky is named after him. Krasinsky was awarded in 1980 the Order of the Badge of Honour and in 1982 the USSR State Prize. He made important contributions to the theory and implementation of Russia's radio interferometric complex "Kvazar-KVO" created at the Институт прикладной астрономии (Institute of Applied Astronomy) of the Russian Academy of Sciences (RAS). For his contribution to the creation of the complex, Krasinsky in 2002 was awarded the Order of Honour.

His students include Elena V. Pitjeva.

Selected publications

References

Soviet astronomers
1939 births
2011 deaths
21st-century Russian astronomers
20th-century Russian astronomers
Scientists from Saint Petersburg